Kwesi Adofo-Mensah (born October 1981) is an American football executive who is the general manager of the Minnesota Vikings of the National Football League (NFL). He previously served as the vice president of football operations for the Cleveland Browns from 2020 to 2021 and also served in various executive roles for the San Francisco 49ers from 2013 to 2019.

Early years
A native of Cherry Hill, New Jersey, Adofo-Mensah attended and earned his bachelor's degree in economics from Princeton University, where he would also walk-on to the basketball team. He earned his master's degree in economics from Stanford University. Before entering the NFL, Adofo-Mensah had several ventures as a portfolio manager and commodities trader on Wall Street.

Executive career

San Francisco 49ers
In 2013, Adofo-Mensah began his NFL career with the San Francisco 49ers, under general manager Trent Baalke, and Head Coach Jim Harbaugh following a chance meeting with the team’s executive vice president of football operations and NFL cap and contract manager Paraag Marathe. As manager of football research and development, Adofo-Mensah developed under Paraag, who is renowned for his cap management work in the NFL.

In 2017, Adofo-Mensah was retained under new general manager John Lynch and was promoted to director of football research and development.

Cleveland Browns
On May 15, 2020, Adofo-Mensah was hired by the Cleveland Browns as their vice president of football operations under general manager Andrew Berry.

Minnesota Vikings
On January 26, 2022, Adofo-Mensah was announced as the new general manager of the Minnesota Vikings.

References

External links
 Minnesota Vikings profile

1981 births
Living people
Cleveland Browns executives
Minnesota Vikings executives
National Football League general managers
People from Cherry Hill, New Jersey
Princeton Tigers men's basketball players
San Francisco 49ers executives
Stanford University alumni